KWRO (630 AM, "Newstalk 630 & 101.1") is a radio station  broadcasting a News Talk Information format. Licensed to Coquille, Oregon, United States, the station is currently owned by Bicoastal Media Licenses Iii, LLC and features programming from Fox News Radio, Compass Media Networks, Premiere Networks, Salem Radio Network, Westwood One, Radio Northwest Network, EIB and more.

KWRO airs University or Oregon football and men's and women's basketball.

History
KWRO was first granted its license on February 17, 1949. The station was assigned the call letters KSHR on 1982-01-18. On 1985-01-04, the station changed its call sign to KBEY and on 1987-05-01 returned to the current KWRO.

References

External links

News and talk radio stations in the United States
WRO
Coos County, Oregon
Radio stations established in 1948
1948 establishments in Oregon